The Guaxindiba River is a river of Rio de Janeiro state in southeastern Brazil.

The Guaxindiba River flows through a flat region of mangroves in the  Guanabara Ecological Station before discharging into the east of Guanabara Bay near the city of Rio de Janeiro.

See also
List of rivers of Rio de Janeiro

References

Rivers of Rio de Janeiro (state)